Carmel Adventist College is an independent Seventh-day Adventist co-educational secondary day and boarding school, located in the  suburb of , Western Australia, Australia. The College caters for students from Years 7 to 12 and is open to any student who wishes to study and learn within a Christian environment. The College is part of the Seventh-day Adventist Church's worldwide educational system, the world's second-largest Christian school system.

History 

This school began as the Darling Range School in 1907.

Charles E Ashcroft, an early Seventh-day Adventist, offered to donate land for the proposed boarding school. Ashcroft's offer was accepted and work began immediately. Church members demonstrated their interest in the venture by contributing both time and money. The school opened 13 January 1907 with H.R. Martin as Principal, and only two students. By the end of the first week the number had grown to five and by the close of the year to 14.

Since its modest beginning in 1907, the school has undergone many changes which culminated in the rebuilding of the main administrative-classroom block in 1977.

The school celebrated its centenary in 2007 and has continued to undergo renovations and changes to improve the appearance and ability to provide an excellent education to its students. This includes the removal of the majority of the property's orchards, allowing for a better view of the valley, the remodeling of the library with the addition of brand new computers and facilities, as well as the changes made to the school's academic and behavioural policies to allow for a difference in learning and discipline.

Facilities

The College offers students a high standard learning facilities such as:

 A newly remodelled and refurbished library, equipped with Apple iMacs
 Dedicated junior classrooms for Year 7 and Year 8
 Newly refurbished classrooms
 A refurbished Food Technology Department
 A recently remodeled Design & Technology Department, incorporating large, fully equipped Automotive, Small Machines, Metalwork and    Woodwork rooms as well as Graphics Technology, Ceramics, Photography and Art rooms
 A computer room, equipped with Apple iMacs
 A fully equipped Science Department
 A full-court Gymnasium, complete with a working fitness area
 A Horticulture Department with orchard and gardens
 Outdoor tennis and basketball courts
 Top and middle ovals
 A high quality computer network enabling high speed wireless (and/or cable connections) with seamless and extensive coverage of the campus.

Spiritual aspects

All students take religion classes each year that they are enrolled. These classes cover topics in biblical history and Christian and denominational doctrines. Instructors in other disciplines also begin each class period with prayer or a short devotional thought, many which encourage student input. Weekly, the entire student body gathers together for an hour-long chapel service with guest speakers and games. Outside the classrooms there is year-round spiritually oriented programming that relies on student involvement.

Sport
Carmel Adventist College rotates its sport selections on an academic term basis. Commonly offered sports include soccer, mountain biking, rock climbing, gymnastics, team games, and basketball.

See also

 Seventh-day Adventist education
 List of schools in the Perth metropolitan area
 List of Seventh-day Adventist secondary schools

References

External links 
Carmel Adventist College

Private secondary schools in Perth, Western Australia
Boarding schools in Western Australia
Educational institutions established in 1907
Adventist primary schools in Australia
Adventist secondary schools in Australia
1907 establishments in Australia